Salah times are prayer times when Muslims perform salah. The term is primarily used for the five daily prayers including the Friday prayer, which takes the place of the Dhuhr prayer and must be performed in a group of worshippers.  Muslims believe the salah times were taught by Allah to Muhammad.

Prayer times are standard for Muslims in the world, especially the fard prayer times. They depend on the condition of the Sun and geography. There are varying opinions regarding the exact salah times, the schools of Islamic thought differing in minor details. All schools of thought agree that any given prayer cannot be performed before its stipulated time.

Most Muslims pray five times a day, with their prayers being known as Fajr (before dawn), Dhuhr (afternoon), Asr (late afternoon), Maghrib (after sunset), and Isha (nighttime), always facing towards the Kaaba. Some Muslims pray three times a day.
The direction of prayer is called the qibla; the early Muslims initially prayed in the direction of Jerusalem before this was changed to Mecca in 624 CE, about a year after Muhammad's migration to Medina.

The timing of the five prayers are fixed intervals defined by daily astronomical phenomena. For example, the Maghrib prayer can be performed at any time after sunset and before the disappearance of the red twilight from the west. In a mosque, the muezzin broadcasts the call to prayer at the beginning of each interval. Because the start and end times for prayers are related to the solar diurnal motion, they vary throughout the year and depend on the local latitude and longitude when expressed in local time. In modern times, various religious or scientific agencies in Muslim countries produce annual prayer timetables for each locality, and electronic clocks capable of calculating local prayer times have been created. In the past, some mosques employed astronomers called the muwaqqits who were responsible for regulating the prayer time using mathematical astronomy.

The five intervals were defined by Muslim authorities in the decades after the death of Muhammad in 632, based on the hadith (the reported sayings and actions) of the Islamic prophet.

Daily prayers 

The five daily prayers are considered obligatory by many and they are performed at times determined essentially by the position of the Sun in the sky. Hence, salat times vary at different locations on the Earth. Wudu is needed for all of the prayers. 

Some Muslims pray three times a day.

Fajr (dawn) 

Fajr begins at —true dawn or the beginning of twilight, when the morning light appears across the full width of the sky—and ends at sunrise.

Dhuhr (midday) 

The time interval for offering the Zuhr or Dhuhr salah timing starts after the sun passes its zenith and lasts until call for the Asr prayer is given.  This prayer needs to be given in the middle of the work-day, and people normally make their prayers during their lunch break.

Shia differs regarding the end of zuhr time. Per all major Jafari jurists, the end of dhuhr time is about 10 minutes before sunset, the time that belongs exclusively to asr prayer. Dhuhr and asr time overlap, apart from the first 5 minutes of dhuhr, which is exclusively delegated for it. Asr prayer cannot be offered before zuhr in the zuhr time.

Asr (afternoon) 

The Asr prayer starts when the shadow of an object is the same length as the object itself (or, according to Hanafi school, twice its length) plus the shadow length at zuhr, and lasts till sunset. Asr can be split into two sections; the preferred time is before the sun starts to turn orange, while the time of necessity is from when the sun turns orange until sunset.

Shia (Jafari madhab) differs regarding start of asr time. Per all major Jafari jurists, start of asr time is about 5 minutes after the time of sun passing through zenith, that time belongs exclusively to dhuhr prayer. Time for dhuhr and asr prayers overlap, but the zuhr prayer must be offered before asr, except the time about 10 minutes before sunset, which is delegated exclusively to asr. In the case that the mentioned time is reached, asr prayer should be offered first (ada - on time) and dhuhr (kada - make up, late) prayer should be offered after asr.

Maghrib (sunset) 

The Maghrib prayer begins when the sun sets, and lasts until the red light has left the sky in the west.

Isha (night) 

The Isha'a or isha prayer starts when the red light is gone from the western sky, and lasts until the rise of the "white light" in the east. The preferred time for Isha is before midnight, meaning halfway between sunset and sunrise.

Time calculation 

To calculate prayer times two astronomical measures are necessary, the declination of the sun and the difference between clock time and sundial clock. This difference being the result of the eccentricity of the earth's orbit and the inclination of its axis, it is called the equation of time. The declination of the sun is the angle between sun's rays and the equator plan.

In addition to the above measures, to calculate prayer times for a specific location we need its spherical coordinates.

In the following; 

  is the time zone. 

  and  denotes the equation of time term and the declination of the Sun for a given date, respectively. 

We first give the midday (Dhuhr) time. The midday time is simply when the local true solar time reaches noon: 

The first term is the 12 o'clock noon, the second term accounts for the difference between true and mean solar times, and the third term accounts for the difference between the local mean solar time and the timezone.

The other times require converting the Sun's altitude to time. We use a variant of the generalized sunrise equation:

This gives, in hours, the difference between Dhuhr time and when the sun is at altitude . Now we calculate three of the other prayer times: 

 If we consider the elevation of the point we should add  to 0.833°, where h is the elevation in meters (see ).
 Maghrib prayer is called for when the sun is completely folded behind the horizon, plus 3 minutes by precaution.
 For Fajr and Isha many conventions about the angle  exist. It is of 17 and 18 degrees respectively for Fadjr and Isha prayers according to the Muslim World League.
 The Asr time is defined in term of the length of its shadow, with differing opinions about how much longer the shadow is. Let  be the required length of the object shadow relative to its own length. We first find the Sun's altitude as  The Asr time is then given as  where the ratio n is 1 or 2 depending on jurisprudence.
 It is possible to also correct for atmospheric refraction, but most sources do not do so. After all, the refraction error is much smaller for α 10°.

Muslims use readily available apps on their phone to find daily prayer times in their locality. Technological advances have allowed for products such as software-enhanced azan clocks that use a combination of GPS and microchips to calculate these formulas. This allows Muslims to live further away from mosques than previously possible, as they no longer need to rely solely on a muezzin in order to keep an accurate prayer schedule.

Friday prayer 

The Friday prayer replaces the dhuhr prayer performed on the other six days of the week. The precise time for this congregational prayer varies with the mosque, but in all cases it must be performed after dhuhr and before asr times. If one is unable to join the congregation, then they must pray the dhuhr prayer instead. This salat is compulsory to be done with ja'maat for men. Women have the option to perform Jumm'ah in the mosque or to pray zuhr.

Other salat

Eid prayers

Taraweeh 

The prayer is performed after Isha prayer, in congregation. 20 rakaat are typically performed; a short rest is taken after every four s.

Salatul Janazah 

The Muslims of the community gather to offer their collective prayers for forgiveness for the dead. The prayer is offered in a particular way with extra (four) takbirs but there is no ruku and sujud. It becomes obligatory for every Muslim adult male to perform the funeral prayer upon the death of any Muslim, however when it is performed by the few it will not be obligation for all. Women also can attend the prayer.

Salatul Istisqa 

See also 
 Canonical hours
 Direction of prayer
 Watchkeeping
 Zmanim

Notes

References 

Salah
Time in religion